Kalevi Rassa (3 February 1936 – 24 October 1963) was a Finnish ice hockey player. He competed in the men's tournament at the 1960 Winter Olympics.

References

External links
 

1936 births
1963 deaths
Olympic ice hockey players of Finland
Ice hockey players at the 1960 Winter Olympics
People from Loimaa
Sportspeople from Southwest Finland